Two and a Half Men is a CBS sitcom that premiered on September 22, 2003. 

On March 13, 2014, Two and a Half Men was renewed for a 12th season, which was announced the following May to be the final season, and premiered on October 30, 2014.  Jon Cryer was the only cast member to appear in every episode of the series.

Series overview

Episodes
Each episode's title is a phrase spoken by one of the characters in that episode. The three exceptions are the pilot episode and the episodes "Alan Harper, Frontier Chiropractor" (season 1) and "Frankenstein and the Horny Villagers" (season 2). The latter episode does fit the criterion, but the quote was part of a deleted scene which Chuck Lorre explains in the episode's vanity card.

Three episode titles are not direct quotes: "Twenty-Five Little Pre-Pubers Without a Snootful" (season 1), "Who's Vod Kanockers?" (season 4), and "Chocolate Diddlers or My Puppy's Dead" (season 8). Charlie states "I'm not going to face all those pre-pubers without a snootful", but the number twenty-five is never mentioned. Jake actually asks "Who is this Vod Kanockers that you speak of?"; however, on the DVD release, that episode is titled "Who Is This Vod Kanockers?". When Charlie sings his song called "Chocolate Diddlers", Alan only suggests that it sounds more like "My Puppy's Dead".

Season 1 (2003–04)

Season 2 (2004–05)

Season 3 (2005–06)

Season 4 (2006–07)

Season 5 (2007–08)

Season 6 (2008–09)

Season 7 (2009–10)

Season 8 (2010–11)

Season 9 (2011–12)

Season 10 (2012–13)

Season 11 (2013–14)

Season 12 (2014–15)

Ratings

References

External links
 
 

Lists of American sitcom episodes